Ashwini Ponnappa Machimanda  (born 18 September 1989) is an Indian badminton player who represents the country at the international badminton circuit in both the women's and mixed doubles disciplines. She had a successful partnership with Jwala Gutta as the pair has won many medals in international events including a gold medal at the Commonwealth Games and bronze medals at the Uber Cup and the Asian Badminton Championships. They were consistently ranked among the top 20 in the BWF World Ranking reaching as high as no. 10. Ponnappa and Gutta also won the bronze medal at the BWF World Championships in 2011, becoming the first Indian pair and women and only the second overall to win a medal at the World Championships.

Early life 
Ashwini Ponnappa was born on 18 September 1989 in Bangalore. She was educated at St. Francis Xavier Girls High School, Bangalore and at St. Mary's College, Hyderabad. Her father played hockey for India. However Ashwini preferred badminton over hockey and started training in badminton.

Career 
In 2001, Ashwini Ponnappa won her first national title in 2004 in the sub-junior girls' doubles category.  She also won the national title in sub-junior girls' doubles in 2005, and the Junior girls' doubles National title in 2006 and 2007.  She won the gold medal in mixed doubles and the team events at the South Asian Games held in 2010. In the 2010 Commonwealth Games, she won the gold medal in Women's Doubles event pairing with Jwala Gutta, making history by winning the first gold medal for India in the event. Gutta and Ponnappa became household names after winning the medal in front of home crowd.

Later on in 2011 they came up with one of their finest performances when she and Gutta etched their names in history books becoming the first Indian pair to ensure a medal at the World Badminton Championships. The pair defeated 12th seeds Vita Marrisa and Nadya Melati of Indonesia 17–21, 21–10, 21–17 to storm into the women's doubles semifinal before losing out to Chinese fifth seeds in the semis in London, thereby winning a bronze in the Badminton World Championship.

She participated in the women's doubles at the 2012 London Olympics. Ponnappa and Gutta lost their opening women's doubles match against the Japanese duo of Mizuki Fujii and Reika Kakiiwa. They then went on to beat much higher ranked Wen Hsing Cheng and Yu Chin Chien of Chinese Taipei 25–23, 16–21, 21–18 to register their first win in the group stages. Jwala and Ashwini missed out on a quarterfinal berth by a difference of just one point, even though they beat Shinta Mulia Sari and Lei Yao of Singapore 21-16 21–15 in their last group B match, after tying with Japan and Taipei on the number of wins. Prior to India's final group game on Tuesday night, the World number five Japanese pair of Mizuki Fujii and Reika Kakiiwa had shockingly lost to Chinese Taipei's Cheng Wen Hsing and Chien Yu Chin, ranked 10th, 19-21 11–21. India lodged a formal protest with the Games organizers to probe if the women's doubles badminton match involving Japan and Chinese Taipei was played in the right spirit, following the elimination of medal hopes Jwala Gutta and Ashwini Ponnappa but no action was taken. Following the Olympic Games Jwala went to a temporary sabbatical from the game. Ponnappa then partnered Pradnya Gadre for a brief period of time in 2013 and then re-united with Jwala later in the year. At the 2014 Commonwealth Games, Ponnappa and Gutta won the silver medal in the women's doubles, losing to a Malaysian pair in the final. On 29 June 2015, playing with Jwala, they won the Canada Open women's doubles title by defeating the top-seeded Dutch pair of Eefje Muskens and Selena Piek. She competed with Gutta at the 2016 Olympics, but they lost all three of their group stage matches and therefore did not progress further. At the 2018 Commonwealth Games, Ponnappa was part of the Indian team which won gold in the mixed team event, and won bronze with N. Sikki Reddy in the women's doubles.

Personal life 
On 24 December 2017, she married businessman and model Karan Medappa.

Achievements

BWF World Championships 
Women's doubles

Commonwealth Games 
Women's doubles

Asian Championships 
Women's doubles

South Asian Games 
Women's doubles

Mixed doubles

BWF World Tour (2 runners-up) 
The BWF World Tour, which was announced on 19 March 2017 and implemented in 2018, is a series of elite badminton tournaments sanctioned by the Badminton World Federation (BWF). The BWF World Tours are divided into levels of World Tour Finals, Super 1000, Super 750, Super 500, Super 300 (part of the HSBC World Tour), and the BWF Tour Super 100.

Women's doubles

BWF Grand Prix (1 title, 3 runners-up) 
The BWF Grand Prix had two levels, the Grand Prix and Grand Prix Gold. It was a series of badminton tournaments sanctioned by the Badminton World Federation (BWF) and played between 2007 and 2017.

Women's doubles

Mixed doubles

  BWF Grand Prix Gold tournament
  BWF Grand Prix tournament

BWF International Challenge/Series (1 title, 6 runners-up) 
Women's singles

Women's doubles

Mixed doubles

  BWF International Challenge tournament
  BWF International Series tournament
  BWF Future Series tournament

Record against selected opponents 
Women's doubles results with Jwala Gutta against Super Series finalists, World Championships semifinalists, and Olympic quarterfinalists.

  Leanne Choo & Renuga Veeran 1–0
  Du Jing & Yu Yang 0–1
  Tang Jinhua & Xia Huan 0–1
  Ma Jin & Wang Xiaoli 0–2
  Tian Qing & Zhao Yunlei 0–9
  Wang Xiaoli & Yu Yang 0–4
  Yang Wei & Zhang Jiewen 0–1
  Luo Ying & Luo Yu 0–4
  Ma Jin & Tang Yuanting 0–1
  Cheng Wen-hsing & Chien Yu-chin 2–2
  Christinna Pedersen & Kamilla Rytter Juhl 0–2
  Poon Lok Yan & Tse Ying Suet 1–1
  Vita Marissa & Nadya Melati 2–1
  Mizuki Fujii & Reika Kakiiwa 1–3
  Miyuki Maeda & Satoko Suetsuna 1–4
  Shizuka Matsuo & Mami Naito 0–3
  Misaki Matsutomo & Ayaka Takahashi 0–2
  Ha Jung-eun & Kim Min-jung 0–3
  Lee Hyo-jung & Kim Min-jung 0–1
  Jung Kyung-eun & Kim Ha-na 1–2
  Chin Eei Hui & Wong Pei Tty 0–5
  Eefje Muskens & Selena Piek 2–2
  Shinta Mulia Sari & Yao Lei 2–4
  Duanganong Aroonkesorn & Kunchala Voravichitchaikul 2–0
  Puttita Supajirakul & Sapsiree Taerattanachai 2–0

References

External links
 
 
 
 
 

Living people
1989 births
Kodava people
Racket sportspeople from Bangalore
Sportswomen from Karnataka
21st-century Indian women
21st-century Indian people
Indian female badminton players
Indian national badminton champions
Badminton players at the 2012 Summer Olympics
Badminton players at the 2016 Summer Olympics
Olympic badminton players of India
Badminton players at the 2010 Commonwealth Games
Badminton players at the 2014 Commonwealth Games
Badminton players at the 2018 Commonwealth Games
Badminton players at the 2022 Commonwealth Games
Commonwealth Games gold medallists for India
Commonwealth Games silver medallists for India
Commonwealth Games bronze medallists for India
Commonwealth Games medallists in badminton
Badminton players at the 2010 Asian Games
Badminton players at the 2014 Asian Games
Badminton players at the 2018 Asian Games
Asian Games bronze medalists for India
Asian Games medalists in badminton
Medalists at the 2014 Asian Games
South Asian Games gold medalists for India
South Asian Games silver medalists for India
Recipients of the Rajyotsava Award 2010
South Asian Games medalists in badminton
Recipients of the Arjuna Award
Medallists at the 2014 Commonwealth Games
Medallists at the 2018 Commonwealth Games
Medallists at the 2022 Commonwealth Games